Killer Instinct is a series of fighting video games originally created by Rare and published by Midway, Nintendo, and Microsoft Studios. The original Killer Instinct was released for arcades in 1994; the game was then released for the Super NES and Game Boy in 1995. Its sequel, Killer Instinct 2, was released for arcades in 1996; the game was then released as Killer Instinct Gold for the Nintendo 64.

The series was rebooted with the release of Killer Instinct (2013) for the Xbox One.

Games

Killer Instinct (1994)

Killer Instinct is an arcade fighting game developed by Rare and published by Midway. Initially released in arcades in 1994, the game advertised it would launch in 1995 for an intended "Nintendo Ultra 64" home console. The Ultra 64 eventually materialized as the Nintendo 64, but never received a version of the original Killer Instinct. Instead, the game received a high-profile launch on the SNES which bundled a CD of remixed game tracks with a limited edition black-colored cartridge, as well as a release on the Game Boy handheld the following year. Both the SNES and Game Boy versions were published by Nintendo. A digital port, titled Killer Instinct Classic, was released as part of a bundle with its 2013 sequel's first season on Xbox One.

Killer Instinct 2 and Killer Instinct Gold (1996)

A 1996 arcade-only game developed by Rare, licensed by Nintendo, and manufactured by Midway. It was the sequel to Killer Instinct. The game was also ported to the SNES, but never released. Like its predecessor, the game features two 8-way joysticks with six buttons each for attacks (three punches and three kicks), allowing for both a single player mode or a two player versus mode. It was later ported to the Nintendo 64 console under the name Killer Instinct Gold, and the port was published by Nintendo. A digital port, titled Killer Instinct 2 Classic, was released as part of a bundle with its 2013 sequel's second season on Xbox One. Killer Instinct Gold was also included as part of the Rare Replay compilation release.

Killer Instinct (2013)

A reboot of the Killer Instinct series, developed by Double Helix Games under supervision of Ken Lobb, and the first game in the series to be published by Microsoft Studios, was released in November 2013 as a launch title for the Xbox One. Following the acquisition of Double Helix Games by Amazon, Iron Galaxy Studios took over the development of post-launch content. A Windows 10 version was released in March 2016 on the Windows Store, and via Steam in September 2017.

Gameplay
Killer Instinct is a fighting game featuring one-on-one combat. The game borrows the attack set of Street Fighter and is also inspired by the finishing moves from Mortal Kombat.

There are also several features that distinguish it from other franchises:
 A double energy bar: instead of winning two rounds, each player has two bars of energy. If a character finishes with their opponent's first life bar, the fight stops and resumes like a round, but the winning character still keeps whatever amount of energy they had at that moment. The player who depletes their opponent's second life bar wins the bout.
 Automatic combos: rather than press the necessary buttons in order to deliver the individual attacks that form a combo, in Killer Instinct the combos are automated and can be enabled by inputting a determined button or special move (which causes the character to deliver a string of hits).
 Finishing moves: Present in the first and second games and bearing resemblance to Mortal Kombat'''s Fatalities, each character has at least two moves known as No Mercy (Danger Move in later revisions) in order to kill the opponent in a violent manner. One of these No Mercy moves can be executed at the end of a combo (which is labeled as an Ultimate combo), when the opponents life bar flashes red (when their second bar is going to be depleted), although it uses a different combination of movements. Unlike a Mortal Kombat Fatality, the No Mercy move does not involve gore and dismemberment. Another finisher is the Humiliation, that forces the opponent to dance (the dance style depends on the character), but this can only be used if the player has their first life bar. Finishing moves that kill the opponent can change the ending that the player receives upon winning the game if the opponent is significant to the player's story in Killer Instinct 2.
 Ultra Combo: Another finisher; it operates like an Ultimate combo, though this one allows the character to deliver a long string of hits as the combo finisher instead, usually surpassing 20 hits, and can sometimes reach upwards of 80+ hits. Ultra combos kill the opponent, which can change the ending that the player receives upon winning the game if the opponent is significant to the player's story and if the game implements multiple endings per character.
 Stage Ultra: Similar to the ultra combo including the fact that it kills the victim, but is unique to the fighting stage and positioning of fighters. When performed correctly it can be as simple as knocking a player out of or off a building to sealing them away in a magical book.
 Combo Breaker: The player who is being caught in a combo may break out of it by performing a combo breaker move. The combo breaker is a designated special move of the player's character. A combo can be broken at either the auto-double or linker stage. To successfully break an auto-double, the player must use the breaker move at a strength lower than the auto-double itself (i.e. to break a Medium auto-double, the player must use a Quick breaker). The combo can also be broken at the linker stage. At this stage the player can use any strength of breaker, making long combos a risky affair. Also, after performing a combo breaker, a white starburst will appear at the tip of the breaker's health bar, enabling advanced versions of some special moves that require a different command.
 In the 2013 Xbox One title, the breaking methods are more specific, where the break must be the same strength as the opponent's chosen attack, openers/enders cannot be broken (unless the combo is opener->ender). If successful, the player knocks away their opponent but does no damage. If the strength of the break or the timing of the break are not correct, the breaking player is locked out from attempting another break for 3 seconds.
 Knockdown Value: Introduced in the 2013 title, combo attacks deplete very little health as they are executed, instead building up a damage potential (indicated by a white haze over the health meter) that must be banked with a finisher attack. While a combo is executed, the knockdown value meter fills. If the combo is not "finished" when this meter is full, the combo immediately ends in a blowout attack and all potential damage begins to regenerate. Instinct Mode can be used to reset this gauge back down to empty and string even longer combos.
 Instinct Mode: Introduced in the 2013 title, as a player takes damage, or performs combo breakers an instinct mode gauge fills up. When full, the player can activate it to earn a unique bonus onto themselves, such as Jago's Endokuken projectiles firing twice and gaining a life drain effect and Black Orchid being able to summon fire cats for attacks. If activated mid-combo, the knockdown value is reset in addition to any other bonus.
 Counter Breaker: Introduced in the 2013 title, this is akin to pre-empting the combo breaker. When an offensive player strings together a combo, they can mix in a counter-breaker feint at any time. If the opposing player responds with a combo breaker of any strength, they will be immediately be placed into a longer than normal lockout (4 seconds instead of 3) and the player's knockdown value will be reset, allowing an even longer uninterrupted combo. If the feint is not met with a combo breaker, the player is left vulnerable to attack.

Characters

Comics
There are two comics series inspired from the Killer Instinct saga, the first is from 1996, from Armada, and the second is from 2016-2017, from Dynamite Entertainment, best known for The Boys'' comics, in a partnership with Microsoft.

References

External links 
 

 
Midway video games
Microsoft franchises
Fighting games
Fighting video games by series
Video game franchises
Rare (company)
Video game franchises introduced in 1994
Video games adapted into comics